Qaiser Ahmed Sheikh (born 12 September 1946) is a Pakistani politician who has been a member of the National Assembly of Pakistan, since August 2018. Previously he was a member of the National Assembly from June 2013 to May 2018.

Qaiser Ahmed Sheikh is a senior politician and a businessman. His family is involved in business for the last 135 years. He is a born leader that is reflected in his decisions and priorities. Due to his involvement in business and politics, he has great exposure that helps him in business richly. This article has all the information about Ahmed Sheikh, including Qaiser Ahmed Sheikh Biography. 

Title	Description
Personal	
Name:	Qaiser Ahmed Sheikh
In Urdu:	قیصر احمد شیخ
Famous As:	Politician
Nationality:	Pakistani
Residence:	Chiniot
Education:	Graduation
Alma Mater:	University of Karachi
Religion:	Islam
Profession:	Politician
Website:	https://www.facebook.com/qaiserahmed.shaikhmna
Born	
Date:	12th September 1946
Place:	Chiniot
Family	
Spouse:	Married
Parents:	Mian Muhamamd Umar
Career	
Political Party:	Pakistan Muslim League N
Serve As:	MNA
Time Period :	2018-present
Old Political Affiliations:	Pakistan Muslim League (N)
Member of the National Assembly	
Constituency:	NA-100 (Chiniot-II)
Assumed office:	20th August 2018

QAISER AHMED SHEIKH BIOGRAPHY
He comes from an area that has almost 40,000 businessmen. He is one of them and has a business of products manufactured in plastics. He is also a seasoned politician associated with Pakistan Muslim League Nawaz. His journey as a politician began as an independent candidate. Ahmed Sheikh has remained the chairman of the Financial Committee in the last government of Nawaz Sharif. According to Shiekh, the road to success goes through education. That was the reason that he established two universities; one is FAST University, and the second one is GC University. He has a prominent position in Chiniot

QAISER ATE OF BIRTH
He is born on 12th September 1946 in Chiniot. Currently, Qaiser Sheikh is residing in the same city.

QAISER AHMED SHEIKH FAMILY
Qaisar belongs to a family that is in business for the last 135 years. His grandfather was the first man in the family to visit Kolkata and start a business that expanded to 4 cities. He is the son of Mian Muhammad Umar.

EDUCATION OF QAISER
He has graduated from the University of Karachi. He studied economics that was his favorite subject

POLITICAL CAREER
INITIAL CAREER
He started his political career from the elections of KCCI that demanded strong courage and resilience. He could not win when he contested the chamber election in 1979 but it proved to be a healthy experience for him. In 1985, he contested the KCCI election and became a member of the Managing Committee with a huge margin of 300 votes. Soon after two years, he became the president of KCCI in 1987
Qaisar entered into mainstream politics in 1993. It was a huge challenge for him as his area was represented by prominent politicians, Faisal Salih Hayat and Syeda Abida Hayat. Though he lost the election in 1993 but he did not quit politics. As he belonged to a strong family, he knew how to handle a defeat at the start of the career. He came back strongly in the election held in 1997. He did not associate with any political party and contested the election independently. 
He won the election with a considerable margin. His votes were higher than the combined votes of Pakistan People’s Party and Pakistan Muslim League Nawaz. It was the election that was swept entirely by PMLN, but he secured his seat independently. He, along with the other independent candidates, formed their group, and Qaisar was nominated its leader.
JOINED PMLN
Qaiser Sheikh contested his next election in 2013 from the ticket of Nawaz league against 15 opponents from NA-86 and won it. He received 77512 votes and defeated one of the strong candidates of the constituency, Zulfiqar Ali Shah, from PPP, who got 46258 votes. Qaisar was also elected as the new chairman of the Finance Committee of the National Assembly in 2015. 
The office of the chairman was lying vacant after Supreme Court unseated Omar Ayub. As he was a successful businessman and represented the KCCI for two years, he was the strongest candidate and was elected unopposed.
In the 2018 election, he was given the ticket by PMLN again. He contested from NA-100 Chiniot-2 and won the election. The contest was a close one as he defeated his opponent by less than 1000 votes. He received 76415 votes while his opponent, Zulfiqar from PTI got 75827 votes.
BUSINESS CAREER
Qaisar is also a businessman by profession. His grandfather was the first to start a business when he visited Kolkata in 1882 and established his business in Kolkata, Madras, Karachi, and Chiniot. Qaisar is having a business of plastic manufacturing products, real estate, and stocks. He has remained the president of KCCI in 1987 and has won the election of Faisalabad Chamber of Commerce too.
Qaisar has vast experience and exposure in business and understands the economy better. According to him, Pakistan had a strong and emerging economy in the 1960s. In an interview, he said that the Koreans sent their delegation to Pakistan to learn about the Pakistani model of economy. He also shared his experience of his first visit to China in 1972. According to him, the Chinese did not have a proper pair of shoes and no cars except a few gifted by Japan. They used cycles to travel, he added.
According to Qaisar Ahmad, the basic principles of success are commitment, hard work, and sincerity with the understanding of technology. He has education on priority. That is why he established two universities; FAST and GC university. Dr. Mehbood-ul-Haq headed FAST university. After his death, Qaisar became the Chairman of the Mehboob-ul-Haq Human Development Centre.

Political career
At one time, he served as president of Karachi Chamber of Commerce and Industry.

He was elected to the National Assembly of Pakistan as a candidate of Pakistan Muslim League (N) (PML-N) from Constituency NA-86 (Jhang) in 2013 Pakistani general election.

He was re-elected to the National Assembly as a candidate of PML-N from Constituency NA-100 (Chiniot-II) in 2018 Pakistani general election.

References 

Living people
Chinioti people
People from Chiniot District
Independent politicians in Pakistan
Pakistani businesspeople
Politicians from Karachi
1946 births
Pakistani MNAs 2013–2018
Pakistani MNAs 2018–2023